The Brunei Times was an independent English-language daily compact broadsheet newspaper published in Brunei Darussalam from 2006 to 2016. It was owned by Brunei Times PLC.

History
The paper was introduced at a soft launch on 1 July 2006 at The Mall, Gadong, Brunei Darussalam, and carried the motto "Fresh Ideas, New Option, Global Vision". It was offered on a complimentary basis until 16 July 2006. The paper went to print in their new printing plant in Junjungan while moving away from its original broadsheet format to a newer compact broadsheet on 28 March 2007.

April 2007 saw The Brunei Times working closely with the Ministry of Communication on the United Nations First Global Road Safety Week Seminar that was held in the International Convention Centre in Berakas, Brunei. In May, The Brunei Times was nominated to be the Official Media for BRIDEX organised by the Ministry of Defence that was held at the International Convention Centre from 31 May to 2 June.

July saw the two major milestones achieved by The Brunei Times. The first was The Brunei Times one year anniversary: The Brunei Times change its masthead to reflect its new corporate image and the paper itself went through a redesign to respond to market forces and changes, adding 4 pages to its content to cater to increasing demand for more local home news. The second milestone was the launch of The Brunei Times Newspaper in Education Programme (BT-NIE) - working with two corporate sponsors in the country, 400 copies of The Brunei Times are now sent daily to 31 secondary schools across Brunei Darussalam. This figure was expected to rise as more and more schools both private and government respond to the BTNIE Programme.

On 1 July 2010, The Brunei Times changed its format to compact size to coincide with its 4th anniversary of the newspaper, in which the newspaper has 48 pages. The Brunei Times was a member of Asia News Network.

Closure 
On 6 November 2016, the newspaper announced in its Sunday masthead that it will cease operations on 8 November, citing "issues relating to business sustainability, especially in the face of considerable challenges from the alternative media". The closure however was looked upon with suspicion due to its abrupt nature without even being addressed on its social media channels. Other investigative sources  claim the closure was rooted by complaints from the Saudi embassy to the Sultan of Brunei upon a news report regarding a hike in visa fees for Bruneian pilgrims to Mecca.

The paper was well-known to test the tight boundaries of local press freedom. The official reasons given by the newspaper were ‘‘business issues,’’ ‘‘challenges from the alternative media,’ and problems with ‘‘reporting and journalistic standards that should meet the mark set.’’ The paper expressed gratitude to the government ‘‘for bearing with us’’ and for ‘‘having continued to extend the license to publish despite all the
issues.’’ More than 100 staff members lost their jobs.

Contents
The Brunei Times focused on news analysis, features, commentaries and op-ed articles on local and foreign happenings. Business and finance also formed its mainstay.

On weekdays, the newspaper was published in two sections of twenty-four (24) pages each. Prior to July 2010, there were 12 pages in each section.

The Brunei Times staff consisted of experienced and dedicated editors from Brunei as well as abroad working alongside local reporters.

See also
 Media of Brunei

References

External links
 

Newspapers published in Brunei
English-language newspapers published in Asia
Publications established in 2006
Publications disestablished in 2016